The Hermitage Road Warehouse Historic District encompasses an industrial district in northern Richmond, Virginia.  It is bounded on the west by Hermitage Street, on the east by Interstate 95, on the north by Sherwood Avenue, and on the south by Overbrook Road.  This area, which contains mainly warehouses, was developed between 1918 and the 1950s, with most development taking place in the last decade of that period.  The warehouses are generally single-story brick structures, although detailing appears in a variety of architectural styles.  There are several multi-story buildings, notably a six-story office block attached to the warehouse of the A. H. Robins building.  The land was originally owned by A. D. Williams, who began selling it off for development in 1918.  Eastward development of the area was halted by the construction of I-95, and only one building was built after 1960.

The district was listed on the National Register of Historic Places in 2014.

See also
National Register of Historic Places listings in Richmond, Virginia

References

National Register of Historic Places in Richmond, Virginia
Historic districts on the National Register of Historic Places in Virginia
Buildings and structures in Richmond, Virginia